Third Time Lucky is a 1949 British crime drama film directed by Gordon Parry and starring Glynis Johns, Dermot Walsh and Charles Goldner; Michael Hordern appears in the small uncredited role of "2nd Doctor". The film was made by producer Mario Zampi and released by General Film Distributors. It was shot at Twickenham and Southall Studios.

Premise
A compulsive gambler falls in love with a woman, and believes she is bringing him luck. Unfortunately, she catches the eye of one of his gambling rivals.

Cast
Glynis Johns as Joan Burns
Dermot Walsh as Lucky
Charles Goldner as Flash Charles
Harcourt Williams as Doc
Yvonne Owen as Peggy
Helen Haye as Old Lady
John Stuart as Inspector
Harold Berens as Young Waiter
Ballard Berkeley as Bertram
Sebastian Cabot as Benny Bennett
Bruce Walker as Jimmy
Marianne Deeming as Madame Therese
Millicent Wolf as Matron
Jean Short as Nurse
Michael Hordern as 2nd Doctor
Edna Kaye as Girl Crooner
Jack Tottenham as Chief Croupier
Tom Block as Dice Croupier

Critical reception
TV Guide gave the film two out of four stars, and called it an "average British programmer".
The Radio Times, again giving the film two (but this time out of five) stars, wrote, "Gordon Parry (in fairness, directing only his second feature) fails to capture the seedy world of gambling dens and backstreet drinking joints."

External links

Review of film at Variety

References

1949 films
1949 crime drama films
British crime drama films
Films directed by Gordon Parry
Films set in London
Films shot at Twickenham Film Studios
Films shot at Southall Studios
Films about gambling
British black-and-white films
1940s English-language films
1940s British films